Chalobah is a surname. Notable people with the surname include:

Nathaniel Chalobah (born 1994), English footballer
Trevoh Chalobah (born 1999), English footballer